Lumbini was one of the fourteen zones of Nepal until the restructure of zones to provinces. It is home to the Lumbini site, the birthplace of Siddhartha Gautama, who later became the historical Buddha and founder of the Buddhist philosophy. The zone's headquarters was Butwal.

Administrative subdivisions
Lumbini was divided into six districts; since 2015 all five districts (plus the western half of Nawalparasi District) have been redesignated as part of Lumbini Province, while the eastern half of Nawalparasi District has been redesignated as part of Gandaki Province.

See also 
 Development Regions of Nepal (Former)
 List of zones of Nepal (Former)
 List of districts of Nepal

References

 
Zones of Nepal
2015 disestablishments in Nepal

bg:Лумбини